Ernest James Wingard (October 17, 1900 – January 17, 1977) nicknamed "Jim", was a professional baseball pitcher. He played four seasons in Major League Baseball for the St. Louis Browns. He started 77 games and relieved in 68 from 1924 to 1927. Wingard's best season was his first, his 3.51 ERA was 10th best in the American League and his 5.1 WAR ranked 9th in the AL, according to Baseball Reference.

He was a good hitting pitcher in his major league career, posting a .232 batting average (57-for-246) with 30 runs, 7 home runs and 38 RBI in 156 games.

Wingard's baseball career would continue in the minor leagues through 1941, including a few seasons as a manager between 1936 and 1941.

External links

Major League Baseball pitchers
St. Louis Browns players
Milwaukee Brewers (minor league) players
Toledo Mud Hens players
Indianapolis Indians players
Troy Trojans (minor league) players
Dothan Browns players
Montgomery Rebels players
Tallassee Indians players
Greenville Lions (minor league) players
Thomasville Lookouts players
Alabama Crimson Tide baseball players
Baseball players from Alabama
People from Prattville, Alabama
1900 births
1977 deaths